Joseph Richard Murphy (September 10, 1880 – October 16, 1944) was a Canadian politician. He represented the electoral district of Halifax South in the Nova Scotia House of Assembly from 1940 to 1944. He was a member of the Nova Scotia Liberal Party.

Murphy was born in 1880 at Halifax, Nova Scotia. He was educated at Ampleforth College, England. He married Marcelle Grace Butler in 1906, and was a wholesale dry goods and clothing manufacturer by career. Murphy entered provincial politics on October 28, 1940, winning a byelection for the Halifax South riding by acclamation. He was re-elected in the 1941 election. Murphy died in office on October 16, 1944.

References

1880 births
1944 deaths
Nova Scotia Liberal Party MLAs
People educated at Ampleforth College